Berremangra is a locality in the Hilltops Council, New South Wales, Australia. It is on both sides of the Hume Highway about 45 km west of Yass. 

Berremangra had a public school described as a "provisional school" from 1872 to 1892, from 1905 to 1913 and from 1919 to 1920. It had a "half-time" school from 1913 to 1915, sharing its teacher with Bookham. It had a public school from 1959 to 1968.

References

Hilltops Council
Localities in New South Wales
Southern Tablelands